512 Squadron may refer to:

No. 512 Squadron RAF
512th Fighter Squadron, United States Air Force
512th Rescue Squadron, United States Air Force
VMF-512, United States Marine Corps